Skov is the Danish word for forest.

Surname 

 Art Skov (1928–2009), hockey referee
 Glen Skov (born 1931), hockey player
 Kira Skov (born 1976), Danish singer
 Peter Skov-Jensen (born 1971), Danish former professional football player
 Rikke Skov (born 1980), Danish handball player
 Søren Skov (born 1954), Danish former professional football player 
 Shayne Skov (born 1990), American football player for college team Stanford Cardinal

Place name
 Riis Skov
 Rold Skov
 Mollerup Skov
 Gribskov Municipality

Danish-language surnames